Anororo is a rural commune  in Madagascar. It belongs to the district of Ambatondrazaka, which is a part of Alaotra-Mangoro Region. The population of the commune was estimated to be approximately 14,992 in 2019.

References 

Populated places in Alaotra-Mangoro